Joseph Michael Gilmore (March 23, 1893 – April 2, 1962) was an American prelate of the Roman Catholic Church. He served as bishop of the Diocese of Helena in Montana from 1936 until his death in 1962.

Biography
Joseph Gilmore was born in New York City in 1893, to John Joseph and Mary Teresa (née Hanrahan) Gilmore, an Irish family. When Joseph was five, in 1898, his family moved to Anaconda, Montana, where his father John worked in the mining industry. 

Joseph Gilmore studied at Loras College in Dubuque, Iowa, obtaining a Bachelor of Arts degree in 1911. He continued his studies at the Urban College of Propaganda in Rome, earning a Doctor of Sacred Theology degree in 1915.

Priesthood 
While in Rome, Gilmore was ordained to the priesthood for the Diocese of Helena on July 25, 1915. Following his return to Montana, Gilmore served as a professor at Carroll College.  In 1920, he became pastor of St. Teresa's Parish in Whitehall, Montana. He served as pastor of St. Helena's Parish in Butte, Montana, from 1925 to 1927. He nextserved as chancellor of the diocese from 1927 to 1936.

Bishop of Helena 
On December 9, 1935, Gilmore was appointed the fifth bishop of the Diocese of Helena by Pope Pius XI. He received his episcopal consecration on February 19, 1936, from Archbishop Amleto Giovanni Cicognani, with Bishops Edwin O'Hara and Joseph McGrath serving as co-consecrators. During his 26-year-long tenure, Gilmore presided over a period of great growth for the diocese. In addition to the material development, programs were developed to foster vocations, help resettle refugees from World War II, retrain unskilled workers, aid in adoptions, and promote the lay apostolate. He was named an assistant at the pontifical throne in 1959.

At age 69, Joseph Gilmore died unexpectedly in San Francisco, California, while attending the installation of Archbishop Joseph McGucken.

References

1893 births
1962 deaths
Clergy from New York City
Roman Catholic bishops of Helena
20th-century Roman Catholic bishops in the United States
Carroll College (Montana)
Loras College alumni
People from Anaconda, Montana